is a Japanese footballer who plays as a centre back for  club Shimizu S-Pulse.

Early and personal life
Takahashi was born in Ōtsu, Shiga Prefecture to a Filipino mother and Japanese father. He has two elder sisters, Maryjun and Yu, who are both models and actresses, and an older brother.

On 15 February 2019, Takahashi married former AKB48 and JKT48 member Aki Takajo.

Club career
On 30 August 2012, it was announced Takahashi would join Australian club Brisbane Roar FC on loan for the 2012–13 A-League. Takahashi would make his debut, albeit a short one, against Wellington Phoenix at Westpac Stadium, replacing Jack Hingert in the 90th minute. Takahashi played his second game for Brisbane Roar on 1 December 2012, coming on as a substitute.

International career
Takahashi has represented Japan at both U18 and U19 levels and in late 2011 took part in 2012 AFC U-19 Championship qualification.

Club statistics
.

References

External links
Profile at Shimizu S-Pulse

 Profile at Kyoto Sanga  
  
Profile at Sagan Tosu

1993 births
Living people
Association football people from Shiga Prefecture
Japanese footballers
Japan youth international footballers
J1 League players
J2 League players
J3 League players
Kyoto Sanga FC players
Kamatamare Sanuki players
J.League U-22 Selection players
Sagan Tosu players
Kashiwa Reysol players
Shimizu S-Pulse players
A-League Men players
Brisbane Roar FC players
Association football defenders
Japanese people of Filipino descent